Dinophalus is a genus of moths in the family Geometridae.

Species
 Dinophalus ampycteria (Turner, 1930)
 Dinophalus atmoscia (Meyrick, 1890)
 Dinophalus bathrosema (Prout, 1911)
 Dinophalus bicorne (Aurivillius, 1920)
 Dinophalus cyanorrhoea (Lower, 1903)
 Dinophalus drakei (Prout, 1910)
 Dinophalus eremoea (Lower, 1907)
 Dinophalus hiracopis (Meyrick, 1890)
 Dinophalus idiocrana Turner, 1930
 Dinophalus incongrua (Walker, 1857)
 Dinophalus lechriomita Turner, 1930
 Dinophalus macrophyes (Prout, 1910)
 Dinophalus oxystoma (Turner, 1939)
 Dinophalus serpentaria (Guenée, 1864)
 Dinophalus thrasyschema (Turner, 1939)

References
 Dinophalus at Markku Savela's Lepidoptera and Some Other Life Forms
 Natural History Museum Lepidoptera genus database

Oenochrominae
Geometridae genera